Anna Artamonova (born ) is a Russian female volleyball player. She was part of the Russia women's national volleyball team.

She participated in the 2006 FIVB Volleyball World Grand Prix.
On club level she played for Zareche in 2006.

References

External links
 Profile at FIVB.org

1980 births
Living people
Russian women's volleyball players
Place of birth missing (living people)
20th-century Russian women
21st-century Russian women